Koko Tanimoto (Née , born November 20, 1944) is a prominent atomic bomb survivor, peace activist, and the eldest of at least four children of Kiyoshi Tanimoto, a Methodist minister famous for his work for the Hiroshima Maidens. Both appear in John Hersey's book, Hiroshima.

On May 11, 1955, her immediate family, including 10-year-old Koko and her father, Kiyoshi, unwittingly appeared on a television program popular in the United States at that time, This Is Your Life, where they were placed in the uncomfortable position of meeting with Captain Robert A. Lewis, copilot of the Enola Gay, which dropped the first atomic bomb on Hiroshima.

Kondo has espoused global peace in such places as Iraq, and speaks frequently at American University in Washington, D.C., her alma mater. Kondo regularly accompanies both Japanese and international students, mostly Americans, from her alma mater, on a peace study tour throughout Japan focusing on the atomic bomb.

When she was living in the United States, she lived with Nobel Prize winner Pearl S. Buck, who greatly influenced her personal work with Japanese orphans.

Kondo received an honorary degree from Webster University in 2014.

See also
 List of peace activists
 Peace education
 Religion and peacebuilding
 World peace

References

Hibakusha
Japanese anti-war activists
Nonviolence advocates
Japanese people of World War II
Japanese women activists
People from Hiroshima Prefecture
American University alumni
Living people
1944 births